Bertie Charles Forbes (May 14, 1880 – May 6, 1954) was a Scottish-American financial journalist and author who founded Forbes magazine.

Life and career
Forbes was born in New Deer, Aberdeenshire, Scotland, the son of Agnes (Moir) and Robert Forbes, a storekeeper and tailor at Whitehill, one of their ten children. After studying at University College, Dundee (then part of the University of St Andrews), in 1897 Forbes worked as a reporter and editorial writer with a local newspaper until 1901 when he moved to Johannesburg, South Africa, where he worked on the Rand Daily Mail under its first editor, Edgar Wallace. He emigrated to New York City in the United States in 1904 where he was employed as a writer and financial editor at the Journal of Commerce before joining the Hearst chain of newspapers as a syndicated columnist in 1911. After two years he became the business and financial editor at Hearst's New York American where he remained until 1916.

He founded Forbes magazine in 1917 and remained editor-in-chief until his death in New York City in 1954, though assisted in his later years by Bruce Charles Forbes (1916–1964) and Malcolm Stevenson Forbes (1919–1990), his two eldest sons.

Forbes was the founder of the Investors League in 1942. He died on May 6, 1954. In 1988, his body was returned to his native Scotland, and lies buried in the New Deer Churchyard at Hill of Culsh in New Deer, Aberdeenshire. While living abroad, he returned to Buchan every two years, staying in the Cruden Bay Hotel, "to entertain people of Whitehill to a picnic". It was a tradition revived by his son, Malcolm, in 1987.

Published works
B.C. Forbes authored several books:

Finance, Business and the Business of Life (1915)
Men Who Are Making America (1917)
Forbes Epigrams (1922)
Men Who are Making the West (1923)
Automotive Giants of America (1925)
How to Get the Most Out of Business (1927)
101 Unusual Experiences (1952)
America's Twelve Master Salesmen (1952)

References

Bibliography

External links

Online Books by B. C. Forbes at The Online Books Page
Bertie Charles Forbes papers at Syracuse University Special Collections Research Center
B. C. Forbes quotes

1880 births
1954 deaths
Alumni of the University of St Andrews
Alumni of the University of Dundee
American business writers
American columnists
American male journalists
American magazine editors
American magazine publishers (people)
British business and financial journalists
British business writers
People from Buchan
Scottish columnists
Scottish emigrants to the United States
Scottish journalists
Scottish magazine editors
Scottish magazine publishers (people)
Scottish non-fiction writers
South African people of Scottish descent
Writers from New York City
B.C.
American financial writers
20th-century Scottish businesspeople